Bambusa clavata  is a species of Bambusa bamboo.

Distribution 
Bambusa clavata is endemic to Bhutan.

Description 
Bambusa clavata grows up to 1000–1200 m in height.
It is perennial. Its six stamen are 8–10 mm long. Stigmas are either 2 or 3. Spikelets comprise 5 to 8 florets, diminishing at the apex. Glumes are numerous.

References 

Flora of Bhutan
clavata